Brock railway station served the hamlet of Brock near Bilsborrow, Lancashire, England, from 1849 to 1939 on the Lancaster and Preston Junction Railway.

History 
The station opened in August 1849 by the Lancaster and Preston Junction Railway. It replaced , which was to the south. To the west was a siding and underneath the platforms was the River Brock. The station closed on 1 May 1939.

Since 2012, the site of the demolished stationmaster's house and a terrace of four railway cottages has become a nature reserve protected by the Fields in Trust charity.

References

External links 

Disused railway stations in the Borough of Wyre
Railway stations opened in 1849
Railway stations closed in 1939
1849 establishments in England
1939 disestablishments in England

Railway stations in Great Britain opened in 1849